Por Ella Soy Eva (International Title: Me, Her... and Eva!, / Lit: For Her, I’m Eva) is a Mexican telenovela produced by Rosy Ocampo for Televisa based on the Colombian soap opera En los tacones de Eva.

Starring Lucero, Jaime Camil, Jesús Ochoa, and Patricia Navidad as the main protagonists; with the first actresses Leticia Perdigón and Helena Rojo as the co-protagonists; while Mariana Seoane, Marcelo Córdoba, Luis Manuel Ávila, and Roberto Ballesteros as the main antagonists. With the stellar performances of Carlos de la Mota, Pablo Valentín, Tiaré Scanda, Dalilah Polanco, Ferdinando Valencia and the first actors Manuel Ojeda and Carlos Bracho; with the special participations of Christina Pastor, Martha Julia, Latín Lover, Eduardo Santamarina, Otto Sirgo, Fabiola Guajardo, María Isabel Benet, and Susana Zabaleta.

On February 20, 2012, Canal de las Estrellas started broadcasting Por ella soy Eva weeknights at 8:15pm, replacing Una familia con suerte. The last episode was broadcast on October 7, with Porque el Amor Manda replacing it the following day. Production of Por Ella Soy Eva officially started on November 15, 2011.

As part of the 2012–2013 schedule, Univision confirmed a primetime broadcast of Por ella soy Eva. The first promo was broadcast on June 10, 2012. Prior to the premiere, a sneak peek was shown on July 10.

On July 16, Univision started broadcasting Por ella soy Eva weeknights at 8pm/7c, replacing one hour of Un Refugio para el Amor. The last episode was broadcast on March 8, 2013, with Porque el amor Manda replacing it on March 11.

As of June 6, 2016 – February 3, 2017, TL Novelas replaced Porque el amor manda with Qué pobres tan ricos on February 6, broadcasting it on 07:00, 13:00 and 19:00.

Plot

Juan Carlos Caballero Mistral (Jaime Camil) is a busy  man working in Grupo Imperio. He is a womanizer who can never get enough. Juan feels he just enjoys the company of women. Everyone in the industry feels he is just a man who plays with women's feelings. But when Helena Moreno Romero (Lucero), a single mother of one son and an ex-employee of Grupo Imperio, enters Juan Carlos' life, he begins to have feelings for Helena, something he has never felt before. Helena regains her position at Grupo Imperio and starts a huge project. They fall helplessly in love with each other and plan to marry and start a family with Helena's son Eduardo (Lalito). Although, given his background, Helena hates Juan Carlos Caballero and Juan Carlos pretends he is Juan Perón, son of an Argentinian ambassador. Helena finds this out and is heartbroken. She feels Juan tricked her and was looking for another "adventure,"and also feels he tried to steal the project she had been working hard on.  Later Plutarco Ramos Arrieta (Marcelo Cordoba) frames him for embezzlement. While in his car, Juan Carlos hears the police sirens.  He is chased by the police until he falls of a cliff and his car explodes. Thinking he is dead, the authorities publicize the message that Juan Carlos is dead. Helena is mourning and feels she will never forget her great love for him. Meanwhile, Juan Carlos is still alive but in hiding. He meets Mimi de La Rosa (Patricia Navidad) and they become extraordinary friends. He tells her his whole story and how he must clear his name. Mimi helps him transform from Juan Carlos Caballero to Eva Maria Leon Jaramillo viuda de Zuloaga. He watches out for Helena and her son while trying to find evidence to clear his name. Although it becomes a very different and difficult life being a lady, Juan Carlos starts to realize his mistake and the consequences of being a womanizer. Eva/Juan applies for a job as Helena's assistant. She/he gets the job and at first, does not get along well with Helena. But soon they become the best of friends. Plutarco falls in love with Helena and becomes Juan's (biggest) enemy. Plutarco proposes to Helena, and Helena accepts. Although Plutarco had a wife, Antonia Reyes de Ramos (Christina Pastor) who died of a heart attack, he also has an ex-lover, Rebeca Oropeza (Mariana Seoane). Rebeca becomes his worst enemy; she is determined to ruin their relationship. But Juan is crushed and gives Helena every reason to hate Plutarco. As Eva, Juan will regain Helena's love, clear his name and realize his dream of being married and having a family with her.

Reception 
Univision's July 17 premiere of Por ella soy Eva averaged 3.7 million viewers. The March 8 finale broadcast averaged 6.6 million viewers, becoming the most watched program Friday night.

Cast

Main cast
Lucero as Helena Moreno Romero de Caballero
Jaime Camil as Juan Carlos Caballero Mistral / Eva León Jaramillo Vda. de Zuloaga
Helena Rojo as Doña Eugenia Mistral de Caballero
Patricia Navidad as Mimí de la Rosa "De la Rose" / Emeteria Jaramillo
Mariana Seoane as Rebecca Oropeza Pérez 
Leticia Perdigón as Doña Silvia Romero Ruíz de Moreno
Jesús Ochoa as Don Adriano Reyes Mendieta
Marcelo Córdoba as Don Plutarco Ramos Arrieta

Also as main
Ferdinando Valencia as Luis Renato Caballero Camargo 
Manuel Ojeda as Don Eduardo Moreno Landeros 
Carlos Bracho as Don Modesto Caballero 
Carlos de la Mota as Santiago Escudero del Real
Pablo Valentín as Fernando Contreras 
Tiaré Scanda as Marcela Noriega de Contreras
Luis Manuel Avila as Onésimo Garza Torres-Treviño
Gabriela Zamora as Angélica Ortega Pérez
Dalilah Polanco as Lucia Zarate 
Geraldine Galván as Jennifer María del Rocío Contreras Noriega
Daniel Díaz de León as Kevin José Contreras Noriega
Nikolas Caballero as Eduardo "Lalito" Moreno Romero
Enrique Montaño as Daniel Merino
Ilse Zamarripa as Claudia Caballero Camargo
Priscila Avellaneda as Vero
Ivonne Garza as Cindy
Marisol Castillo as Jacqueline
Guadalupe Bolaños as Nelly
Roberto Ballesteros as Lic. Rául Mendoza 
Héctor Ortega as Don Richard Fairbanks

Special participation
Susana Zabaleta as Doña Eva María León Jaramillo viuda de Zuloaga / Doña Yadira Rivers 
Roger Cudney as Mr. Keaton
Laura Carmine as Camila de Fairbanks
Julio Bracho as Dagoberto Preciado
Maria Isabel Benet as Carmen Camargo 
Adrián Uribe as Isidro “Chilo” Chávez
Christina Pastor as Antonia Reyes Mendieta de Ramos 
Arturo Carmona as Mario Lizárraga
Manuela Ímaz as Patricia Lorca Beristáin
Luis Gatica as Gustavo
Eduardo Santamarina as Diego Fonticoda
Martha Julia as Samantha Millan
Shaila Dúrcal as Cecilia Montiel Rivadeneyra
Fabiola Guajardo as Paola Legarreta
Otto Sirgo as Don Jesús Legarreta
Latín Lover as Maximiliano "Gino" Montes

Awards

TVyNovelas Awards 2013 
Nominations were confirmed on April 8, 2013. The winners we’re announced on April 28, 2013.

Los Favoritos del Público 
Nominations were confirmed on April 8, 2013. The winners were announced on April 27, 2013.

References

External links 
Por Ella Soy Eva in Univision's website

Mexican telenovelas
Televisa telenovelas
2012 telenovelas
2012 Mexican television series debuts
2012 Mexican television series endings
Mexican television series based on Colombian television series
Spanish-language telenovelas
Television shows set in Mexico City
Television shows set in Acapulco